The Coalmont Bank Building, also known as Sewanee Fuel & Iron Company Building, is an historic building in Coalmont, Tennessee, United States, that now serves as the city hall and local library.

Coalmont was created as a company town in 1903, operated by the Sewanee Coal, Coke and Land Company, which reorganized in 1908 as the Sewanee Fuel and Iron Company. The company built the Coalmont Bank Building in 1921 to house both civic facilities and company offices. A bank and post office were located on the first floor and the company had its offices on the second floor.

Located on Tennessee State Route 56, the building was added to the National Register of Historic Places in 1991 as the Coalmont Bank Building.

References

External links
 . National Park Service, 1987.

City halls in Tennessee
Bank buildings on the National Register of Historic Places in Tennessee
Buildings and structures in Grundy County, Tennessee
Commercial buildings completed in 1921
National Register of Historic Places in Grundy County, Tennessee